Ronald Lawrence Fotofili (born 6 July 1998) is a Tongan athlete. He competed in the men's 100 metres event at the 2019 World Athletics Championships, where he was eliminated in the preliminary round. He also competed in the men's 100 metres event at the 2020 Summer Olympics, where he suffered the result. He was a batonbearer for the 2022 Commonwealth Games Queen's Baton Relay when the baton came to Tonga in February 2022.

Fotofili is from the village of Lapaha and attended Tupou College, where he began competing in athletics.

References

External links
 

1998 births
Living people
Tongan male sprinters
Place of birth missing (living people)
World Athletics Championships athletes for Tonga
Athletes (track and field) at the 2020 Summer Olympics
Olympic male sprinters
Olympic athletes of Tonga
20th-century Tongan people
21st-century Tongan people
Athletes (track and field) at the 2022 Commonwealth Games